MRT Assembly Channel  is a television channel in North Macedonia owned and operated by Macedonian Radio-Television. The channel was formed in 1991 as an experimental channel, but now it broadcasts the activities from the Assembly of the Republic of North Macedonia.

References

External links
www.mtv.com.mk

Television channels in North Macedonia
Television channels and stations established in 1991
Macedonian Radio Television
1991 establishments in the Republic of Macedonia